Khammam Police Commissionerate is a city police force with primary responsibilities in law enforcement and investigation within Khammam area.

References 

Telangana Police
Government agencies established in 2016
2016 establishments in Telangana